Parliamentary elections were held in Northern Cyprus on 15 December 2003. Having come fourth in the 1998 elections, the Republican Turkish Party emerged as the largest party in the Assembly of the Republic, winning 19 of the 50 seats.

Electoral system
Northern Cyprus is divided into five constituencies, electing a total of 50 members of the Assembly by proportional representation. Voters can cast as many votes in their district as there are seats.

Results

Aftermath
Under the Turkish Cypriot constitution, the members of the new parliament must gather to be sworn in 10 days after the results are officially published. Soon after this first session, President Rauf Denktaş had to decide whom to ask building a government. As a result he asked Mehmet Ali Talat of the Republican Turkish Party (CTP) to form the next government. Talat had 15 days to establish a coalition government. It was hard for him to build a government. The two blocs in the parliament, the "pro Annan plan" bloc and the "status quo" bloc, each had 25 seats in parliament. The National Unity Party refused Talat's offer to build a government together, and as a result the only way to build a government for Talat was to get the Democratic Party (DP) to join his government. After some unsuccessful talks, the DP agreed to build a coalition with the CTP. As a result a coalition relying on a narrow majority of 26 out of 50 seats was built.

References

Northern Cyprus
Elections in Northern Cyprus
2003 in Northern Cyprus
2000s in Cypriot politics
December 2003 events in Europe